Nicolás Sarquís (March 6, 1938 – April 19, 2003) was an Argentine film director and screenwriter. His first full-length film was Palo y hueso (1968), filmed in black and white. He died of lung cancer in 2003.

Filmography
1965 Después de hora (short)
1968 Palo y hueso
1971 Talampaya (short)
1972 Navidad (short)
1974 La muerte de Sebastián Arache y su pobre entierro
1981 The Underground Man
1984 Zama
1989 Menem, retrato de un hombre (documentary)
1990 El fin de Heginio Gómez (short)
1995 Facundo, la sombra del tigre
1998 Sobre la tierra

References

External links
 

Argentine film directors
1938 births
2003 deaths
Argentine people of Syrian descent
Deaths from lung cancer
Deaths from cancer in Argentina
Place of birth missing